Pruvanserin (EMD-281,014, LY-2,422,347) is a selective 5-HT2A receptor antagonist which was under development by Eli Lilly and Company for the treatment of insomnia. It was in phase II clinical trials in 2008 but appears to have been discontinued as it is no longer in the company's development pipeline. In addition to its sleep-improving properties, pruvanserin has also been shown to have antidepressant, anxiolytic, and working memory-enhancing effects in animal studies.

See also 
 Eplivanserin
 Pimavanserin
 Glemanserin
 Roluperidone
 Volinanserin
 Ziprasidone
 Lenperone
 Lidanserin

References 

5-HT2A antagonists
Eli Lilly and Company brands
Indoles
Aromatic nitriles
N-benzoylpiperazines
Phenethylamines